Hugh Macdonald,  (May 4, 1827 – February 28, 1899) was a lawyer, judge and member of the First Canadian Parliament. He represented the Antigonish riding of Nova Scotia, from 1867 to 1869, along with William Hallett Ray, as an Anti-Confederate and, from 1869 to 1873, as a Liberal-Conservative.

The son of Allan MacDonald and Christina Cameron, he was educated at Saint Francis Xavier University and called to the Nova Scotia bar in 1855. McDonald married Sarah Smith in 1856. He practiced law in Antigonish, Nova Scotia. McDonald represented Antigonish County in the Legislative Assembly of Nova Scotia from 1859 to 1863. In 1872, he was named Queen's Counsel.

MacDonald served as President of the Queen's Privy Council for Canada and Minister of Militia and Defense in 1873. Later that year, he resigned his seat in parliament to accept an appointment to the Nova Scotia Supreme Court.

McDonald served as puisne judge in the Supreme Court from November 1873 until he retired from the bench in 1893.

Election results

References 
 

Anti-Confederation Party MPs
Judges in Nova Scotia
Conservative Party of Canada (1867–1942) MPs
Members of the House of Commons of Canada from Nova Scotia
Members of the King's Privy Council for Canada
Nova Scotia Anti-Confederation Party MLAs
Progressive Conservative Association of Nova Scotia MLAs
1827 births
1899 deaths
Canadian King's Counsel